The Catholic Church in Ghana is part of the worldwide Catholic Church, under the spiritual leadership of the pope in Rome.

, there were 2.7 million Catholics in Ghana, or 12.6% of its population. The country is divided into 20 dioceses including four archdioceses and 1 Vicariate.

Accra
Ho 
Jasikan
Keta–Akatsi 
Koforidua
Donkorkrom
Cape Coast
Sekondi–Takoradi 
Wiawso
Kumasi
Goaso
Konongo–Mampong
Obuasi
Sunyani
Techiman
Tamale
Damongo
Navrongo–Bolgatanga
Wa
Yendi

References and notes